This is a list of Portuguese television series. The programs are listed alphabetically and are followed by the genre of the show and the date of the original run.

!$@

0–9
5 Para A Meia-Noite - Talk show

A
A Banqueira do Povo - Telenovela, 1993
A Fé dos Homens - religion
A Grande Aposta - Telenovela, 1997–1998
A Jóia de África - 2002
A Lenda da Garça - Telenovela, 1999
A Noite da Má Língua
A Outra - Telenovela, 2008
A Senhora das Águas - Telenovela, 2001–2002
Acontece - Cultural Programme, 1995-2003
Agora Escolha - Interactive Show, 1986-1994; 2011
Agora É Que Conta - Game show
Água de Mar - 2014
Ajuste de Contas - Telenovela, 2000–2001
Alentejo Sem Lei
Alta Tensão - Music show
Amanhecer - Telenovela, 2002
Anjo Meu - Telenovela, 2011
Anjo Selvagem - Telenovela, 2001–2003
Aqui Não Há Quem Viva

B
Baía das Mulheres - Telenovela, 2004–2005
Bem-Vindos a Beirais - 2013–2016
Big Show SIC
Boa Tarde - Talk show
Buéréré

C
Câmara Clara
Chiquititas - Telenovela, 2007–2008
Chuva de Maio - Musical, 1990
Chuva na Areia - Telenovela, 1985
Cidade Despida - Crime drama
Cinzas - Telenovela, 1992
Clube dos Campeões
Companhia das Manhãs
Conta-me como foi - Historical drama
Coração Malandro - Telenovela, 2003
Curto Circuito

D
Dá-me Música - Music show
Dei-te Quase Tudo - Telenovela, 2005–2006
Deixa que te Leve - Telenovela, 2009–2010
Deixa-me Amar - Telenovela, 2007–2008
Depois do Adeus - Historical drama, 2013–present
Desencontros - Telenovela, 1995
Desporto 2 - Sports
Destino Imortal - Fantasy drama, 2010
Diz que é uma Espécie de Magazine - Talk/comedy show
Doce Fugitiva - Telenovela, 2006–2007
Duarte & C.ª

E
Ele é Ela
Espírito Indomável - Telenovela

F
Fala-me de Amor - Telenovela, 2006
Fama Show
Fascínios - Telenovela, 2007–2008
Feitiço de Amor - Telenovela, 2008–2009
Festival da Canção - Music show
Filha do Mar - Telenovela, 2001
Os Filhos do Rock - Historical, 2013-2014
Filhos do Vento - Telenovela, 1997
Flor do Mar - Telenovela, 2008–2009
Floribella - Telenovela, 2006–2007
Fúria de Viver - Telenovela, 2002

G
Ganância - Telenovela, 2001
Gato Fedorento - Comedy
Glória - Historical thriller drama, 2021

H
Herman 2010 - 2010
Herman Enciclopédia - Comedy
Hoje - News show, 2010–2013
Horizontes da Memória

I
Ídolos - Music show
Ilha dos Amores - Telenovela, 2007
Inspector Max

J
Jardins Proibidos - Telenovela, 2000–2001
Jornal 2 - News
Jornal da Noite - News
Jornal da Tarde - News
Jornal da Uma - News
Jornal Nacional - News
Jornalistas
Jura - Telenovela, 2006–2007
Julie e os fantasmas - Musical show 2003

K

L
Laços de Sangue - Telenovela, 2010–Present
Lado B
Liberdade 21, Drama
Lua Vermelha
Lusitana Paixão - Telenovela, 2002

M
Mar de Paixão - Telenovela
Maternidade - Medical drama, 2011–2013
Meu Amor - Telenovela, 2009–2010
Mistura Fina - Telenovela, 2004–2005
Morangos com Açúcar - Telenovela/Teen drama, 2003–Present
Mundo Meu - Telenovela, 2005–2006

N
Na Paz dos Anjos - Telenovela, 1994
Natal dos Hospitais
Nico d'Obra - Comedy
Ninguém Como Tu - Telenovela, 2005
Nunca Digas Adeus - Telenovela, 2001

O
O Clube das Chaves
O Dom, 2011
Os Donos do Jogo
O Jogo - Telenovela, 2004–2006
O Juiz Decide
O Olhar da Serpente - Telenovela, 2002–2003
O Preço Certo - Game show
O Programa do Aleixo - Comedy
O Tal Canal - Comedy
O Teu Olhar - Telenovela, 2003–2004
O Último Beijo - Telenovela, 2002–2003
Os Andrades
Os Contemporâneos - Comedy
Olhar O Mundo
Os Homens da Segurança
Os Melhores Anos, Teen drama
Olhos de Água - Telenovela, 2001
Olhos nos Olhos - Telenovela, 2008–2009
Operação Triunfo - Music show, 2010
Origens - Telenovela, 1983
Os Lobos - Telenovela, 1998

P
Pai à Força - Drama
Paixões Proibidas - Telenovela, 2007
Palavras Cruzadas - Telenovela, 1987
Paraíso Filmes - Comedy
Passerelle - Telenovela, 1988
Perfeito Coração - Telenovela, 2009–2010
Plano Inclinado
Podia Acabar o Mundo - Telenovela, 2008–2009
Portugal em Directo
Portugal FM - Comedy
Portugal no Coração - Talk/variety show
Portugal Radical - Sports
Portugal Tem Talento - Talent show, 2011
Portugueses Pelo Mundo
Praça Pública
Praça da Alegria
Primeiro Amor - Telenovela, 1996
Primeira Jornal - News
Programa das Festas
Prós e Contras - Debate show

Q
Quadratura do Círculo
Quem Quer Ser Milionário
Queridas Feras - Telenovela, 2003–2004

R
Rebelde Way - 2008-2009
Remate - Sports News, 1984-2001
Remédio Santo - Telenovela, 2011–Present
República - Historical drama, 2011
Resistirei - Telenovela, 2007–2008
Ricardina e Marta - Telenovela, 1989
Riscos - Teen drama
Rosa Fogo - Telenovela, 2011
Roseira Brava - Telenovela, 1996
Rua Sésamo - Children's show, 1989–1994

S
Sabadabadu - Comedy, 1981
Saber Amar - Telenovela, 2003
Salve-se Quem Puder
Secret Story - Casa dos Segredos - 2010
Sedução - Telenovela
Sentimentos - Telenovela, 2009–2010
Sinais de Vida - Medical drama, 2013–Present
Sonhos Traídos - Telenovela, 2002

T
Telejornal - News show, 1959-Present
Telhados de Vidro - Telenovela, 1993
Tempo de Viver - Telenovela, 2006–2007
Terra Mãe - Telenovela, 1998
The Voice Portugal - Singing talent show, 2011–present
Todo o Tempo do Mundo - Telenovela, 1999–2000
Top + - Music/Music Chart and Video show, 1991-2012
Tu e Eu - Telenovela, 2006–2007
Tudo Por Amor - Telenovela, 2002
TV Rural - Agricultural Programme, 1960-1990
TV2 Jornal - News Show

U
Último a Sair, 2011
Uma Aventura, 2000-2007
Uma Canção Para Ti - Music, 2011
Um Estranho Em Casa

V
Vai Tudo Abaixo - Comedy
Verão Quente - Telenovela, 1993
Vidas de Sal - Telenovela, 1996
Vila Faia - Telenovela, 1982
Vila Faia - Telenovela, 2008–2009
Vingança - Telenovela, 2007
Você na TV! - 2012

X

Y

ZZé Gato - Crime dramaZip ZapZip-Zip'' - Talk and Variety Show, 1969

See also
Television in Portugal

 
Lists of television series by country of production
Television series
Television series